Chinnadantha Maga is a 1983 Indian Kannada-language film, directed by K. S. R. Das and produced by K. T. Venkatagiri. The film stars Vishnuvardhan, Madhavi, K. R. Vijaya and Thoogudeepa Srinivas. The film has musical score by Chellapilla Satyam. The film was a remake of the director's own Telugu film Talli Kodukula Anubandham.

Cast

Vishnuvardhan as Guruprasad
Madhavi as Usha
Kalyan Kumar as Ramachandra Rao, Guruprasad's father
K. R. Vijaya
Thoogudeepa Srinivas as Vishakanthaiah
Chethan Ramarao
Vijay Kashi
Sadashiva Brahmavar as Ranga
Rathnakar
Sudheer as Kalabhairava
N. S. Rao
Kunigal Nagabhushan as an advocate
Vishwanath
Bheema Rao
Jr. Narasimharaju
Kumari Indira
Anuradha as Lakshmi, Guruprasad's sister
M. Jayashree
Shanthamma
Mamatha
Mangalagowri
Jyothilakshmi
Jayamalini as Sunitha

Soundtrack
The music was composed by Satyam.

References

External links
 
 

1983 films
1980s Kannada-language films
Films directed by K. S. R. Das
Films scored by Satyam (composer)
Kannada remakes of Telugu films